Rugby in Ireland may refer to:

Rugby union in Ireland
Rugby league in Ireland